Hesya Mirovna (Meerovna) Helfman 1855, Mazyr — 1 (N.S. 13) February 1882, Saint Petersburg), was a Russian revolutionary member of Narodnaya Volya, who was implicated in the assassination of Tsar Alexander II.

Biography

Early life
Born into a Jewish family, Helfman left home for Kiev at the age of 16 or 17, allegedly to avoid an arranged marriage, where she found employment in a sewing factory.

Revolutionary activities

In the early 1870s, Helfman was an active member of several revolutionary clubs in Kiev where she met, among others, Leo Deutsch and her future husband . Helfman was sentenced to two years' imprisonment at the  during the 1877 , and on 14 March 1879 was sent into exile to the province Novgorod.

She escaped a few months later and joined Narodnaya Volya in Saint Petersburg, probably following her husband who was a member of the organization's executive committee. In 1881 Helfman was part of the Narodnaya Volya group that assassinated Alexander II, albeit not in a front-line position; she was assigned to run a conspiratorial flat, where she lived with another member of the group, Nikolai Sablin, as an unsuspicious apparent married couple. When the police raided their apartment, two days after the deadly attack on the tsar, Sablin shot himself while she was captured.

Death

During the Pervomartovtsy trial in March 1881, Helfman refused to admit her guilt, but was nonetheless sentenced to death by hanging for her alleged part in the assassination of the tsar. A few hours after being convicted, she made a statement that "in view of the ... sentence I have received, I consider it my moral duty to declare that I am in the fourth month of pregnancy". Her husband Nikolay Kolodkevich had also been arrested in January 1881. According to contemporary law execution of pregnant women was banned as the fetus was considered innocent. Therefore, Helfman's execution was officially postponed until forty days after childbirth, and in the meantime she would stay in the harsh Peter and Paul Fortress prison.

Three months later, thanks to the campaign against her execution by Socialists in Western Europe and in the foreign press, Helfman's sentence was commuted to an indefinite period of katorga. She was transferred back to the remand prison where she had been held before. On 5 July (NS), whilst still in the Peter and Paul Fortress and by permission of the Minister of the Interior, Count Ignatiev, she was granted an interview (which lasted almost an hour and a half) with a journalist from the newspaper Golos who was accompanied by her defence counsel at her trial, a lawyer named Goerke. During the course of this interview, she complained about the lack of "proper medical and female attendance".

Helfman gave birth in detention in October 1881. Upon the request of the Department of Police, her childbirth was assisted by a gynaecologist who was also employed by the Imperial court, something unprecedented. She had a severe maternal complication, as her perineum was torn. It was rumoured that the gynaecologist had refused the prison doctor's suggestion to sew the wound together; in any case, it never healed. She remained delirious during some of the postnatal period. By 24 November, she had developed peritonitis, which became acute on 17 January 1882. She nevertheless nursed her daughter from her birth in October until 25 January, when the baby was taken away from her, placed in an orphanage and registered as a child of unknown parents. According to the subsequent medical report, the peritonitis became general and caused fever on the same day. Six days later, Helfman died. Her child died of an unknown disease shortly thereafter. Tsarist authorities had rejected the request of Kolodkevich's parents for the legal custody of the baby. Kolodkevich died in prison in 1884.

Legacy
The importance of Helfman's role in the assassination was undetermined, and her Jewish origins stressed during the pogroms that followed the assassination. Another conspirator, Ignacy Hryniewiecki, was also rumoured to be Jewish, though there seems to have been no basis for this.

Revolutionary Sergey Stepnyak-Kravchinsky dedicated a chapter of his Underground Russia (1883) to Helfman, the only one dedicated to a person he had not met personally. Writes Stepnyak:

Notes

Citations

References

 
 
 

1852 births
1882 deaths
People from Mazyr
People from Mozyrsky Uyezd
Belarusian Jews
Belarusian revolutionaries
Jewish socialists
Narodnaya Volya
Narodniks